Carlos Cuero (born Esmeraldas, Ecuador, 18 February 1996) is an Ecuadorean professional footballer who plays as a defender for Aucas in the Ecuadorian Serie A.

Club career
Cuero was at C.S.D. Independiente del Valle, but transferred to Cuenca as a makeweight in the player and cash deal, that saw the goalkeeper Hamilton Piedra move the other way.

International career
In October 2018, Cuero was called up to the Ecuador national football team by manager Hernán Darío Gómez.  On October 12, 2018, he made his debut for the full national side in a friendly against the Qatar.

References

1996 births
Living people
Ecuadorian footballers
Ecuador international footballers
People from Esmeraldas Province
C.S.D. Independiente del Valle footballers
C.D. Cuenca footballers
S.D. Aucas footballers
Association football defenders
C.S. Norte América footballers